The 2019–20 East Carolina Pirates men's basketball team represents East Carolina University during the 2019–20 NCAA Division I men's basketball season. The Pirates are led by second year head coach, Joe Dooley, who previously coached the Pirates from 1995 to 1999, and play their home games at Williams Arena at Minges Coliseum as sixth-year members of the American Athletic Conference.

Previous season
The Pirates finished the 2018–19 season 10–21, 3–15 in AAC play to finish in 11th place. They lost in the first round of the AAC tournament to Wichita State.

Offseason

Departures

Incoming transfers

Recruiting class of 2019

Recruiting class of 2020

Roster

Dec. 17, 2019 - Seth LeDay left the team after the Maryland Eastern Shore game.

Schedule and results

|-
!colspan=9 style=| Non-conference regular season

|-
!colspan=9 style=| AAC regular season

|-
!colspan=9 style=|AAC tournament

1.Cancelled due to the Coronavirus Pandemic

Awards and honors

American Athletic Conference honors

All-AAC Second Team
Jayden Gardner

Player of the Week
Week 7: Jayden Gardner
Week 10: Jayden Gardner

Source

References

East Carolina Pirates men's basketball seasons
East Carolina
East Carolina Pirates men's basketball
East Carolina Pirates men's basketball